The Society of Fire Protection Engineers (SFPE) is a professional society for fire protection engineering established in 1950 and incorporated as an independent organization in 1971. It is the professional society representing those practicing the field of fire protection engineering. The Society has over 5,000 members and 100+ chapters, including many student chapters worldwide.

SFPE and NFPA publish the Fire Technology Journal through Springer, and Fire Protection Engineering magazine is published quarterly by SFPE.

Conferences 
SFPE hosts an Annual Conference & Expo, which attracts over 400 professionals from around the globe including experts from the U.S., Canada, Europe, South America, Asia, Africa, Middle East, and the Oceanic. Each year, SFPE hosts the Europe Conference on Fire Safety Engineering or International Performance-Based Design Codes and Fire Safety Design Methods Conference.

Codes and Standards 
The association's codes and standards include:

SFPE Standard on Calculating Fire Exposures to Structures
SFPE Standard on Calculation Methods to Predict the Thermal Performance of Structural and Fire Resistive Assemblies

Engineering Guides 

 Guide to Human Behavior in Fire, 2nd edition
 Engineering Guide: Fire Safety for Very Tall Buildings
 Guide for Substantiating a Fire Model for a Given Application
 Guide for Peer Review in the Fire Protection Design Process
 Performance-Based Fire Protection, 2nd Edition
 Predicting Room of Origin Fire Hazards (Archived)
 Guide for Fire Risk Assessment
 Code Officials Guide to Performance-Based Design Review
 Piloted Ignition of Solid Materials Under Radiant Exposure
 Evaluation of the Computer Fire Model DETACT-QS
 Engineering Guide to Predicting 1st and 2nd Degree Skin Burn
 Engineering Guide to Assessing Flame Radiation to External Targets from Liquid Pool Fires

References

External links
 Society of Fire Protection Engineers (official site)
 Fire Protection Engineering (magazine)
Fire Technology Journal

Firefighters associations
Professional associations based in the United States
Organizations based in Maryland